Ireneusz Golda (born 23 January 1955) is a Polish athlete. He competed in the men's hammer throw at the 1980 Summer Olympics.  His personal best in the hammer throw was 77.96 meters in 1982.

References

External links
 

1955 births
Living people
Athletes (track and field) at the 1980 Summer Olympics
Polish male hammer throwers
Olympic athletes of Poland
Sportspeople from Greater Poland Voivodeship
People from Poznań County